Bakerhill or Baker Hill is a town in Barbour County, Alabama, United States, near Eufaula.  According to the 2010 U.S. Census, the town had a population of 279. Although it existed as an unincorporated village since before 1860, the town was officially incorporated in 1997.

Geography 
Bakerhill is located at 31.88 degrees north, 85.15 degrees west (31.88495, -85.15390).

The surrounding countryside is mostly rolling hills covered in mostly in pine forest. Small-scale logging, as well as bauxite mining and minor livestock raising activities account for most of the local area's business activities. The town also, as of 2009, includes two gas stations as well as a grill & bar and a small, family owned and operated deer processing business. There is also a small feed mill.

The soil is mostly reddish clay and sand.  Numerous Native American artifacts have been discovered there.

Demographics

See also

 List of towns in Alabama

References

External links

 Zone 1 News - Breaking News, Investigative Reports, Video Coverage
 Brief information about Bakerhill
 Bakerhill profile from Alabama.gov

Towns in Barbour County, Alabama
Towns in Alabama
1997 establishments in Alabama
Populated places established in 1997